"Can't Sing a Different Song" is a song performed by Australian singer-songwriter, Ricki-Lee Coulter. Co-written by Coulter, Andy Love and Pete Martin, the song serves as the third and final single released from the singer's second album, Brand New Day. It was released both digitally and physically on 15 March 2008. The music video for "Can't Sing a Different Song" was directed by Fin Edquist and filmed in the Footscray Warehouses in Melbourne.

Track listing
CD single
 "Can't Sing a Different Song" - 3:14
 "World Go By" (Bonus track) - 3:42
 "Can't Sing a Different Song" (Clubbangaz remix) - 3:14
 "Can't Sing a Different Song" (Instrumental) - 3:13
 "Can't Sing a Different Song" (A cappella) - 3:13

Digital download
 "Can't Sing a Different Song" - 3:13
 "Can't Sing a Different Song" (Clubbangaz remix) - 3:13
 "Can't Sing a Different Song" (Instrumental) - 3:12
 "Can't Sing a Different Song" (A cappella) - 3:12
 "Can't Sing a Different Song" (Supermelody remix) - 4:21

Credits and personnel
Credits adapted from the liner notes of Ricki-Lee: The Singles.

Locations
Mixed at Sing Sing Studios.
Mastered at Stepford Audio.

Personnel
Songwriting – Ricki-Lee Coulter, Pete Martin, Andy Love
Production and engineering – Pete Martin
Mixing – Tony Espie
Mastering – Dave Walker

Charts
"Can't Sing a Different Song" debuted on the ARIA Singles Chart at number eight, before dropping twenty-six spots down to number 34 the following week. It became Coulter's fifth top-ten single in Australia and ranked at number 50 on the ARIA End of Year top 50 Australian artists singles of 2008.

Weekly chart

Year-end chart

Release history

References

2008 singles
Ricki-Lee Coulter songs
Songs written by Ricki-Lee Coulter
2008 songs
Shock Records singles